Plante Moran is the 11th largest audit, accounting, tax, consulting, investment banking, and wealth management firm in the United States according to Inside Public Accounting's 2019 list of the “Top 100” firms. Plante Moran, headquartered in Southfield, Michigan, employs more than 3,000 people and has 27 offices through Michigan, Ohio, Illinois, Colorado, and in Mexico, India, Japan and China.

Plante Moran is a member of Praxity, an international association of independent accounting firms. This alliance is an association of independent firms in the major markets of North America, South America, Europe, and Asia. Other firms associated with Praxity include BKD LLP, Moss Adams LLP, and Dixon Hughes Goodman LLP. In 2021, Fortune magazine ranked Plante Moran at number 91 on their Fortune List of the Top 100 Companies to Work For in 2021 based on an employee survey of satisfaction. This was the 23rd consecutive year the firm made the list.

History
Plante Moran was founded by Elorion Plante in 1924. Frank Moran was named partner in 1950, and the firm became known as Plante & Moran. The pair had originally met when Moran, a philosophy student, became a tutor for Plante's daughter, and that philosophy training would lay the foundation for what Moran called “a people firm disguised as an accounting firm.” In 1955, Moran became managing partner, remaining in the role until stepping down and becoming chairman in 1981.

By the early 1960s, a third of the firm's revenue came from non-accounting services. In 1977, the firm created its first affiliate, Total Personal Financial Planning, now known as Plante Moran Financial Advisors. Their first mergers came in 1986 under the direction of Managing Partner Edward Parks, and included expansion into three Michigan cities (Kalamazoo, Battle Creek, Benton Harbor/St. Joseph), as well as Cleveland, Ohio.

Several more additions to service capabilities came in the 1990s under the direction of Bill Matthews, who was named managing partner in 1993. That same year, Plante Moran Financial Advisors registered with the SEC, and just one year later, Plante Moran Cresa (commercial real estate advisors) was formed. The firm created P&M Corporate Finance, an investment banking group, in 1996, and in 1998, Plante & Moran Benefits Administration LLC (now Plante Moran Group Benefits Advisors) was formed.

In 2001, Bill Hermann was named managing partner. The following year, the firm was chosen to help investigate the Enron collapse, and Plante Moran Trust was formed. Their international expansion began shortly after, with offices being opened in Shanghai, China, Monterrey, Mexico, and Mumbai, India by 2009. During that time, the firm also merged with Gleeson, Sklar, Sawyers and Cumpata (GSS&C), adding three Illinois offices.

In 2009, Gordon Krater became managing partner. During his time as leader, the firm opened an office in Detroit, Michigan, and merged with two other firms, Stuart Franey Matthews & Chantres P.C. and Blackman Kallick. They also dropped the ampersand from their name, becoming “Plante Moran,” and won the First-Ever Global Workplace Recognition with International Accounting Bulletin's Employer of the Year award. In 2011, Krater and his predecessor, Bill Hermann, coauthored Succession Transition: A Roadmap for Seamless Transitions in Leadership. The following year, the firm began their Women in Leadership program to address the issue of women dropping out of the firm before reaching the most senior positions.

In 2017, Jim Proppe assumed the managing partner role. Later that year, the firm opened its fourth international office in Tokyo, Japan, and the following year, the firm expanded its presence into the western United States after merging with Denver-based EKS&H. This brought their number of staff to over 3,000, the highest in firm history, and at the time made them the 11th largest accounting firm in the nation.

Culture
Plante Moran's emphasis on culture stems from founder Frank Moran's philosophy training and his notion of the firm as a “grand experiment” — a values-based, people-first accounting firm. Their “wheel of progress” philosophy suggests that hiring and retaining the best talent will produce the best service to clients leading to success that continually rolls on for all involved. Methods for retaining the best talent include maintaining a “relatively jerk-free culture” and emphasizing the importance of work-life balance, or what Moran called the “life on a tightrope approach.”  Some of Plante Moran's most-emphasized values include their “We care” philosophy and the Golden Rule. Their culture has earned them several awards over the years, including FORTUNE's Best Places to Work for Millennials, Best Places to Work for Parents, Best Places to Work for Women, and the 100 Best Companies to Work For, as well as several industry-based and geography-based awards.

Services 

Audit
Tax
Wealth management
Commercial real estate advising
Cost and margin intelligence
Cybersecurity
Data analytics
Employee benefits consulting
ERP consulting
Finance & accounting solutions
International services
Investment banking
Restructuring & transformation
Risk management
Strategy
Supply chain & operations
Talent
Technology consulting
Transaction advisory services
Valuation services

Industries served

Construction 
Dealerships
Education
Energy
Family office services
Financial services
Food & beverage
Franchise
Government
Healthcare
Insurance services
Life sciences
Manufacturing and distribution
Not-for-profit
Private equity
Professional services
Real estate
Restaurants
Retail 
Technology companies

Affiliated services
 P&M Corporate Finance LLC (PMCF) 
 Plante Moran Financial Advisors 
 Plante Moran Trust 
 Plante Moran CRESA, LLC 
 Plante Moran Group Benefit Advisors

References

Accounting firms of the United States
Business services companies established in 1924
1924 establishments in Michigan